Maulana Muhammad Amir Siddique is an Imam who was appointed, in 2009, as deputy-imam at the Islamabad's Red Mosque. 
In May 2009, Siddique was named on the list of "Individuals banned from the UK for stirring-up hatred". The reason for the ban is that he is "Considered to be engaging in unacceptable behaviour by fomenting terrorist violence in furtherance of particular beliefs."

References

Living people
Sunni imams
Year of birth missing (living people)